Sedat Bornovalı (born 31 May 1970 in Istanbul) is an art historian (PhD), interpreter and  professional tourist guide in Italian, English and Turkish.

As an art historian, Dr. Bornovali has contributed to several publications and projects. As a tour guide and interpreter he has served several religious leaders, including Pope Benedict XVI, the Ecumenical Patriarch Bartholomew I of Constantinople, as well as several statesmen, including Presidents Giorgio Napolitano, Abdullah Gül and Recep Tayyip Erdoğan.

Dr. Bornovali is also coordinating the restoration and renovation of the Istanbul Italian Society’s Garibaldi House (Società Operaia Italiana di Mutuo Soccorso) in Beyoğlu.

Awards
 2008  Knight of the Italian Republic / Order of Merit: Cavaliere Ordine al Merito della Repubblica Italiana
 2010 Istanbul Tourism Awards - Special Award
2011 "Quality in Tourism" - Skal International

Affiliations
 Vice President of the Istanbul Tourist Guides' Guild (IRO) since 2002
 Cultural Awareness Foundation Board of Trustees since 2009
 Vice Chairman of Turkish Society of Art History since 2010
 Vice President of the Istanbul Italian High School Alumni since 2010
 Member of Turkish Archeological Sites and Museums Consulting Committee since 2010
 2014 Member of European Association of Archaeologists 20th Annual Meeting Advisory Board

Books 
 The Bosphorus: An Illustrated Story. From Prehistory to The Eurasia Tunnel 2019 
 Boğaziçi'nin Tarih Atlası (The Historical Atlas of the Bosphorus) 2018 
 Tarihin En Uzun Şiiri Ayasofya

Notes

External links 
 

Writers from Istanbul
Liceo Italiano alumni
Turkish art historians
Turkish translators
1970 births
Living people
Knights of the Order of Merit of the Italian Republic
Tour guides
Interpreters